Aayon Ibn Aayon (died on Dhu al-Qadah 385 AH/December 995 AD), known as Ibn Aayon, was an Arab Muslim kahhal (ophthalmologist) during the period of medieval Islam. He moved from Kairouan to Egypt with Al-Mu'izz li-Din Allah, and he was known in Egypt during the caliphate of Al-Aziz Billah. His most notable work is Of eye diseases and their treatment. Ibn Aayon was mentioned on Uyūn ul-Anbāʾ fī Ṭabaqāt al-Aṭibbā, a book written by Ibn Abi Usaibia.

References

995 deaths
Year of birth unknown
Opticians of the medieval Islamic world
Physicians from the Fatimid Caliphate
10th-century Arabs